Show Time is the sixth album by the American funk band Slave, released in 1981. Show Time was the last album that singer/drummer Steve Arrington recorded with the band. The album reached number seven on the  Top Soul Albums charts. The lead single, "Snap Shot", reached number six on the Soul Singles charts.

Track listing
"Snap Shot" 4:43 (Mark Adams, Steve Arrington, Charles Carter, Jimmy Douglass, Floyd Miller)
"Party Lites" 4:55 (Adams, Arrington, Carter, Webster)
"Spice of Life" 4:57 (Douglas, S. Carter, Arrington)
"Smokin'" 5:25 (S. Carter, Webster, Arrington)
"Wait for Me" 5:18 (Adams, Arrington, Carter, Webster)
"Steal Your Heart" 5:24 (Adams, Arrington, Carter, Douglass, Webster)
"For the Love of U" 5:08 (Adams, Arrington, Carter, Carter, Miller, Webster)
"Funken Town" 3:46 (C. Carter, Webster, Miller, Johnson, Parker, S. Carter, Arrington)

2022 CD Reissue Bonus Tracks
"Wait for Me" (7" Version) 3:40
"Snap Shot" (12" Version) 6:16

Personnel

Slave
Danny Webster: lead and rhythm guitar, percussion, lead and backing vocals
Kevin Johnson: rhythm and lead guitar
Sam Carter: keyboards, percussion, vocals
Charles Carter: flute, saxophone, keyboards
Mark Antone Adams: bass guitar, keyboards, vocals
Steve Arrington: drums, percussion, vocals
Roger Parker: drums, percussion
Delburt Taylor: keyboards, flute, trumpet, flugelhorn, vocals
Floyd Miller: trumpet, trombone, percussion

Additional musicians
Fred Zlotkin, Guy Lumia, Harold Kohon, Harry Lookofsky, Jesse Levine, Jonathan Abramowitz, Marilyn Wright, Mitsue Takayama: Strings (charts written and arranged by Mark Adams and Cengiz Yaltkaya; conducted by Cengiz Yaltkaya)

Production
Produced by Jimmy Douglass
Recorded and engineered by Ed "The American" Garcis
Mixed by Jimmy Douglass and Mark Adams
Mastered by Ted Jensen

Charts

Singles

External links
 Slave - Show Time at Discogs

References

1981 albums
Slave (band) albums
Cotillion Records albums